Lamar is a town in Hughes County, Oklahoma, United States. The population was 158 at the 2010 census.

History
After the Missouri, Oklahoma and Gulf Railway (later the Kansas, Oklahoma and Gulf Railway (KO&G) constructed a line in 1907 connecting Dustin and Calvin, the Lamar community developed midway between the two towns. A post office was established on July 23, 1907. On September 14, 1907, J. R. Luttrell published the first issue of the weekly Lamar News. Two years later Lamar had a bank, a livery, a cotton gin, a lumberyard, a tin shop, a hardware store, and five general stores.  Lamar incorporated on January 2, 1908. In 1909 R. L. Polk's Oklahoma State Gazetteer and Business Directory estimated that Lamar had a population of five hundred. Citizens passed a ten-thousand-dollar bond issue in May 1909 for the construction of a two-story, brick school building, completed in May 1910.

On July 5, 1922, Lamar became a consolidated school district. In October of that year citizens voted by a margin of two to one to incorporate the town. After the Bank of Lamar voluntarily liquidated on December 12, 1928, residents conducted their banking in Holdenville. During the 1940s and 1950s the town supported several groceries and gas stations.

The first federal census for Lamar reported a population of 250 in 1930. The number peaked at 296 in 1940. By 1950 it had declined to 180 and continued on a downward spiral to a low of 97 in 1990. At the turn of the twenty-first century Lamar served as a "bedroom" community for 172 residents, the majority of whom commuted thirty to forty-five minutes to work. The 2010 census recorded 158 inhabitants.

By 1918 the surrounding agricultural area supported two cotton gins, two blacksmith shops, a bank, four general stores, and sundry other businesses. With an estimated population of 350, citizens attended the Baptist and Methodist churches and read the weekly newspaper, the Lamar Sun.

Geography
Lamar is located in eastern Hughes County at  (35.098974, -96.125242).

Lamar sits at the eastern foot of  Lamar Mountain, which rises  over the center of town. Lamar drains to the east via Gobbler Creek to the Canadian River.

Demographics

As of the census of 2000, there were 172 people, 68 households, and 53 families residing in the town. The population density was 14.3 people per square mile (5.5/km2). There were 77 housing units at an average density of 6.4 per square mile (2.5/km2). The racial makeup of the town was 86.63% White, 0.58% African American, 10.47% Native American, and 2.33% from two or more races. Hispanic or Latino of any race were 1.74% of the population.

There were 68 households, out of which 27.9% had children under the age of 18 living with them, 66.2% were married couples living together, 7.4% had a female householder with no husband present, and 20.6% were non-families. 20.6% of all households were made up of individuals, and 11.8% had someone living alone who was 65 years of age or older. The average household size was 2.53 and the average family size was 2.83.

In the town, the population was spread out, with 24.4% under the age of 18, 3.5% from 18 to 24, 22.7% from 25 to 44, 26.7% from 45 to 64, and 22.7% who were 65 years of age or older. The median age was 45 years. For every 100 females, there were 91.1 males. For every 100 females age 18 and over, there were 100.0 males.

The median income for a household in the town was $26,250, and the median income for a family was $28,125. Males had a median income of $28,750 versus $20,417 for females. The per capita income for the town was $11,131. About 4.8% of families and 6.8% of the population were below the poverty line, including 3.9% of those under the age of eighteen and 7.1% of those 65 or over.

References

Towns in Hughes County, Oklahoma
Towns in Oklahoma
Populated places established in 1907